Aleksandr Aleksandrovich Averyanov (born 23 September 1969) is a retired Russian professional footballer. He made his professional debut in the Soviet Second League in 1985 for SK FShM Moscow. He played 2 games in the UEFA Cup 2000–01 for FC Alania Vladikavkaz.

His father Aleksandr Nikolayevich Averyanov was a noted football coach, Aleksandr Aleksandrovich often played on the teams managed by his father.

References

1969 births
Sportspeople from Mykolaiv
Living people
Soviet footballers
Russian footballers
FC Volyn Lutsk players
FC Karpaty Lviv players
FC Okean Nakhodka players
Russian Premier League players
PFC Krylia Sovetov Samara players
FC Torpedo Moscow players
FC Torpedo-2 players
FC Elista players
FC Spartak Vladikavkaz players
FC Khimki players
FC Volgar Astrakhan players
Association football midfielders
FC FShM Torpedo Moscow players